Ri Kum-Song (born 23 May 1980) is a North Korean long-distance runner who specializes in the marathon.

He competed in the 2008 Olympic marathon. He also finished eighth at the 2006 Asian Games.

His personal best time is 2:14:30 hours, achieved at the 2007 Pyongyang Marathon.

References

1980 births
Living people
North Korean male marathon runners
Athletes (track and field) at the 2008 Summer Olympics
Olympic athletes of North Korea
Athletes (track and field) at the 2006 Asian Games
Asian Games competitors for North Korea